Meadow River Lumber Building  is a historic building located on the grounds of the State Fair of West Virginia at Fairlea, Greenbrier County, West Virginia. It was built in 1928, to showcase the products of the Meadow River Lumber Company (MERILUCO).  It is a one-story, Bungalow-style frame building with a small center front gable rising from the roofline.  The front facade features a full length front porch.

It was listed on the National Register of Historic Places in 1997.

References

External links
 Meadow River Lumber Company, Highway 60, Rainelle, Greenbrier, WV at the Historic American Engineering Record (HAER), showing the partly demolished mill in Rainelle but not the demonstration cottage at the fairgrounds

Commercial buildings on the National Register of Historic Places in West Virginia
National Register of Historic Places in Greenbrier County, West Virginia
Bungalow architecture in West Virginia
Commercial buildings completed in 1928
Buildings and structures in Greenbrier County, West Virginia
Historic American Engineering Record in West Virginia
1928 establishments in West Virginia